The 2017 Supercopa de Chile was the fourth edition of this championship organised by the Asociación Nacional de Fútbol Profesional (ANFP).

The match was played between the 2016-17 Primera División Best-Champions Universidad Católica, and the 2016 Copa Chile Winners Colo-Colo.

Road to the final

The two teams that contested the Supercopa were Universidad Católica, that qualified as 
Apertura 2016-17 Champion and the Best Champion in the accumulated table, and Colo-Colo, that qualified for the match as the winner of the 2016 Copa Chile, defeating Everton 4:0 at the Estadio Nacional.

Details

References

Super
Club Deportivo Universidad Católica matches
Colo-Colo matches